James Pender Duncanson (died 21 January 1870) was a British merchant in Hong Kong and member of the Legislative Council of Hong Kong.

Duncanson was member of the trading firm Gibb, Livingston & Co. He was made Justice of the Peace in August 1867 and member of the Legislative Council of Hong Kong in May 1868 when vice Francis Parry resigned.

He died in 1870 in Hong Kong.

References

British expatriates in Hong Kong
British businesspeople
Members of the Legislative Council of Hong Kong
Year of birth missing
1870 deaths